Balka is a village and seaside resort in Denmark. Balka or Bałka may also refer to:

 Balka, Snizhne, a settlement in Snizhne, Donetsk Oblast, Ukraine
 Balka Suman (born 1983), Indian politician
 Mirosław Bałka (born 1958), Polish artist

See also
 Balk (disambiguation)
 Balkan (disambiguation)
 Balke, a surname